Agathosma betulina (previously Barosma betulina) is a flowering plant in the family Rutaceae, native to the lower elevation mountains of western South Africa, where it occurs near streams in fynbos habitats.

Growth
The flowers are white or pale pink, with five petals; the fruit is a five-parted capsule which splits open to release the seeds.

Etymology
It is known by the common name round leaf buchu. The very similar plant Agathosma crenulata (previously Barosma crenulata) is known as the oval leaf buchu, and has been used for the same purposes. The two are chemically distinct, however; for example, A. betulina contains quercetin-dimethyl ether-glucoside, while A. crenulata does not.

Uses
Wild plants of this species are still plentiful but are being harvested faster than they can reproduce. The threat of their becoming scarce has led to efforts to cultivate them. The essential oils and extracts of the leaves are used as flavoring for teas, candy, and a liquor known as buchu brandy in South Africa. The two primary chemical constituents of the oils of A. betulina are isomenthone and diosphenol. The extract is said to taste like blackcurrant.

Folk medicine
The plant has been used by the indigenous people of South Africa to as a folk remedy for various disorders, including urinary tract infections. Dutch settlers in early times used Agathosma betulina commonly called buchu to make a brandy tincture. The tincture is still used today.

References

A. crenulata and A. betulina
Van Wyk, Ben-Erik (2005). Food Plants of the World. Portland Oregon: Timber Press, Inc.  
Lis-Balchin M., Hart S. and Simpson E. (2001). Buchu (Agathosma betulina and A. crenulata, Rutaceae) essential oils: their pharmacological action on guinea-pig ileum and antimicrobial activity on microorganisms. J Pharm Pharmacol. 53(4):579-82.

Zanthoxyloideae
Plants used in traditional African medicine